Albert L. Marshall was an American football player and coach. He served as the head football coach at the North Dakota Agricultural College–now known as North Dakota State University–from 1904 to 1905, compiling a record of 4–7–1. Marshall played college football at the University of Wisconsin, where he was a quarterback during the 1900 and 1901 seasons.

Head coaching record

References

Year of birth missing
Year of death missing
American football quarterbacks
North Dakota State Bison football coaches
Wisconsin Badgers football players